The following is a list of Streptomyces species, organized alphabetically by species name. Names that have not been validated according to the Bacteriological Code are enclosed in "quotes".

, there are 679 valid species of Streptomyces and an additional 121 provisional species. New species continue to be discovered (e.g., S. gossypiisoli, described in 2021). Many species are named after their colorful hyphae and/or spores.

A

 Streptomyces abietis Fujii et al. 2013
 Streptomyces abikoensis (Umezawa et al. 1951) Witt and Stackebrandt 1991

 Streptomyces abyssalis Xu et al. 2012
 "Streptomyces abyssomicinicus" Komaki et al. 2020
 Streptomyces achromogenes Okami and Umezawa 1953 (Approved Lists 1980)
 Streptomyces acidicola Lipun et al. 2020
 Streptomyces acidiscabies Lambert and Loria 1989

 Streptomyces actinomycinicus Tanasupawat et al. 2016
 "Streptomyces actuosus" Pinnert et al.
 Streptomyces aculeolatus Shomura et al. 1988
 "Streptomyces adephospholyticus" Murao and Nishino 1973
 Streptomyces adustus Lee and Whang 2016
 "Streptomyces aegyptia" El-Naggar et al. 2011
 Streptomyces afghaniensis Shimo et al. 1959 (Approved Lists 1980)
 Streptomyces africanus Meyers et al. 2004
 Streptomyces aidingensis Xia et al. 2013
 "Streptomyces aizunensis" Miyamura et al. 1973
 Streptomyces alanosinicus Thiemann and Beretta 1966 (Approved Lists 1980)
 Streptomyces albaduncus Tsukiura et al. 1964 (Approved Lists 1980)
 Streptomyces albiaxialis Kuznetsov et al. 1993
 "Streptomyces albicerus" Sun et al. 2020
 Streptomyces albidochromogenes Preobrazhenskaya 1986
 Streptomyces albidoflavus (Rossi Doria 1891) Waksman and Henrici 1948 (Approved Lists 1980)
 "Streptomyces albidus" Kaewkla and Franco 2021
 Streptomyces albiflavescens Han et al. 2015
 Streptomyces albiflaviniger Goodfellow et al. 2008

 Streptomyces albofaciens Thirumalachar and Bhatt 1960 (Approved Lists 1980)
 Streptomyces alboflavus (Waksman and Curtis 1916) Waksman and Henrici 1948 (Approved Lists 1980)
 Streptomyces albogriseolus Benedict et al. 1954 (Approved Lists 1980)

 Streptomyces alboniger Porter et al. 1952 (Approved Lists 1980)
 Streptomyces albospinus Wang et al. 1966 (Approved Lists 1980)

 Streptomyces albulus Routien 1969 (Approved Lists 1980)
 Streptomyces albus (Rossi Doria 1891) Waksman and Henrici 1943 (Approved Lists 1980)
 Streptomyces aldersoniae Kumar and Goodfellow 2010
 Streptomyces alfalfae She et al. 2016
 Streptomyces alkaliphilus Akhwale et al. 2015
 Streptomyces alkaliterrae Świecimska et al. 2021
 Streptomyces alkalithermotolerans Sultanpuram et al. 2015

 Streptomyces alni Liu et al. 2009
 Streptomyces althioticus Yamaguchi et al. 1957 (Approved Lists 1980)
 Streptomyces altiplanensis Cortés-Albayay et al. 2019
 Streptomyces amakusaensis Nagatsu et al. 1963 (Approved Lists 1980)
 Streptomyces ambofaciens Pinnert-Sindico 1954 (Approved Lists 1980)

 Streptomyces amphotericinicus Cao et al. 2017
 Streptomyces amritsarensis Sharma et al. 2014
 Streptomyces anandii Batra and Bajaj 1965 (Approved Lists 1980)
 Streptomyces andamanensis Sripreechasak et al. 2016
 Streptomyces angustmyceticus (Yüntsen et al. 1956) Kumar and Goodfellow 2010
 Streptomyces anthocyanicus (Krassilnikov et al. 1965) Pridham 1970 (Approved Lists 1980)
 Streptomyces antibioticus (Waksman and Woodruff 1941) Waksman and Henrici 1948 (Approved Lists 1980)

 "Streptomyces antioxidans" Ser et al. 2016
 Streptomyces anulatus (Beijerinck 1912) Waksman 1953 (Approved Lists 1980)

 Streptomyces apocyni Liu et al. 2020
 Streptomyces aqsuensis Wang et al. 2018
 Streptomyces aquilus Li et al. 2020

 Streptomyces araujoniae Da Silva et al. 2014
 Streptomyces arboris Liu et al. 2020
 Streptomyces arcticus Zhang et al. 2016
 Streptomyces ardesiacus (Baldacci et al. 1955) Komaki and Tamura 2020
 Streptomyces ardus (De Boer et al. 1961) Witt and Stackebrandt 1991
 Streptomyces arenae Pridham et al. 1958 (Approved Lists 1980)

 Streptomyces aridus Idris et al. 2017
 Streptomyces armeniacus (Kalakoutskii and Kusnetsov 1964) Wellington and Williams 1981
 Streptomyces artemisiae Zhao et al. 2010
 Streptomyces ascomycinicus Kumar and Goodfellow 2010
 Streptomyces asenjonii Goodfellow et al. 2017
 Streptomyces asiaticus Sembiring et al. 2001
 Streptomyces asterosporus (ex Krassilnikov 1970) Preobrazhenskaya 1986
 Streptomyces atacamensis Santhanam et al. 2012
 "Streptomyces atlanticus" Silva et al. 2016
 Streptomyces atratus Shibata et al. 1962 (Approved Lists 1980)
 Streptomyces atriruber Labeda et al. 2009

 Streptomyces atroolivaceus (Preobrazhenskaya et al. 1957) Pridham et al. 1958 (Approved Lists 1980)
 Streptomyces atrovirens (ex Preobrazhenskaya et al. 1971) Preobrazhenskaya and Terekhova 1986
 Streptomyces aurantiacus (Rossi Doria 1891) Waksman 1953 (Approved Lists 1980)
 "Streptomyces auranticolor" Ikushima et al. 1980
 Streptomyces aurantiogriseus (Preobrazhenskaya 1957) Pridham et al. 1958 (Approved Lists 1980)
 Streptomyces auratus Goodfellow et al. 2008
 Streptomyces aureocirculatus (Krassilnikov and Yuan 1965) Pridham 1970 (Approved Lists 1980)

 Streptomyces aureorectus (ex Taig et al. 1969) Taig and Solovieva 1986

 Streptomyces aureoverticillatus (Krassilnikov and Yuan 1960) Pridham 1970 (Approved Lists 1980)
 Streptomyces aureus Manfio et al. 2003

 Streptomyces avermitilis (ex Burg et al. 1979) Kim and Goodfellow 2002
 Streptomyces avicenniae Xiao et al. 2009
 Streptomyces avidinii Stapley et al. 1964 (Approved Lists 1980)
 Streptomyces axinellae Pimentel-Elardo et al. 2009

 Streptomyces azureus Kelly et al. 1959 (Approved Lists 1980)

B

 Streptomyces bacillaris (Krassilnikov 1958) Pridham 1970 (Approved Lists 1980)
 Streptomyces badius (Kudrina 1957) Pridham et al. 1958 (Approved Lists 1980)

 Streptomyces baliensis Otoguro et al. 2009

 Streptomyces bambusae Nguyen and Kim 2016
 Streptomyces bangladeshensis Al-Bari et al. 2005
 Streptomyces barkulensis Ray et al. 2014
 "Streptomyces bathyalis" Risdian et al. 2021
 Streptomyces bauhiniae Kanchanasin et al. 2020
 Streptomyces beijiangensis Li et al. 2002
 Streptomyces bellus Margalith and Beretta 1960 (Approved Lists 1980)
 Streptomyces bikiniensis Johnstone and Waksman 1947 (Approved Lists 1980)
 "Streptomyces bingchenggensis" Gao et al. 2007

 Streptomyces blastmyceticus (Watanabe et al. 1957) Witt and Stackebrandt 1991
 Streptomyces bluensis Mason et al. 1963 (Approved Lists 1980)
 Streptomyces bobili (Waksman and Curtis 1916) Waksman and Henrici 1948 (Approved Lists 1980)
 Streptomyces bohaiensis Pan et al. 2015
 Streptomyces boluensis Tokatli et al. 2021
 Streptomyces boncukensis Tatar et al. 2021
 Streptomyces boninensis Také et al. 2018
 Streptomyces bottropensis Waksman 1961 (Approved Lists 1980)
 Streptomyces brasiliensis (Falcão de Morais et al. 1966) Goodfellow et al. 1986
 Streptomyces brevispora Zucchi et al. 2012
 "Streptomyces brollosae" El-Naggar and Moawad 2015
 Streptomyces broussonetiae Mo et al. 2020
 Streptomyces bryophytorum Li et al. 2016
 "Streptomyces buecherae" Hamm et al. 2020
 Streptomyces bullii Santhanam et al. 2013
 Streptomyces bungoensis Eguchi et al. 1993
 Streptomyces burgazadensis Saricaoglu et al. 2014

C

 "Streptomyces caatingaensis" Santos et al. 2015
 Streptomyces cacaoi (Waksman 1932) Waksman and Henrici 1948 (Approved Lists 1980)
 Streptomyces cadmiisoli Li et al. 2019
 Streptomyces caelestis De Boer et al. 1955 (Approved Lists 1980)
 Streptomyces caeni Huang et al. 2018
 Streptomyces caeruleatus Zhu et al. 2011

 "Streptomyces caespitosus" Sugawara and Hata 1956
 Streptomyces cahuitamycinicus Saygin et al. 2020
 Streptomyces caldifontis Amin et al. 2017
 Streptomyces calidiresistens Duan et al. 2014

 Streptomyces calvus Backus et al. 1957 (Approved Lists 1980)
 "Streptomyces cameroonensis" Boudjeko et al. 2017
 "Streptomyces camponoti"  Piao et al. 2017
 Streptomyces camponoticapitis Li et al. 2016
 Streptomyces canalis Xie et al. 2016
 Streptomyces canarius Vavra and Dietz 1965 (Approved Lists 1980)

 Streptomyces candidus (ex Krassilnikov 1941) Sveshnikova 1986

 Streptomyces cangkringensis Sembiring et al. 2001
 Streptomyces caniferus (ex Krassilnikov 1970) Preobrazhenskaya 1986
 Streptomyces canus Heinemann et al. 1953 (Approved Lists 1980)
 Streptomyces capillispiralis Mertz and Higgens 1982
 Streptomyces capitiformicae Jiang et al. 2018
 Streptomyces capoamus Gonçalves de Lima et al. 1964 (Approved Lists 1980)
 Streptomyces capparidis Wang et al. 2017
 "Streptomyces carminius" Wang et al. 2018
 Streptomyces carpaticus Maximova and Terekhova 1986
 Streptomyces carpinensis (Falcão de Morais et al. 1971) Goodfellow et al. 1986
 "Streptomyces castaneus" Zhou et al. 2017
 Streptomyces castelarensis (Cercós 1954) Kumar and Goodfellow 2008

 Streptomyces catenulae Davisson and Finlay 1961 (Approved Lists 1980)
 "Streptomyces cattleya" Noble et al. 1978
 Streptomyces cavernae Fang et al. 2020

 Streptomyces cavourensis Skarbek and Brady 1978 (Approved Lists 1980)
 Streptomyces cellostaticus Hamada 1958 (Approved Lists 1980)
 Streptomyces celluloflavus Nishimura et al. 1953 (Approved Lists 1980)
 Streptomyces cellulolyticus Li 1997
 Streptomyces cellulosae (Krainsky 1914) Waksman and Henrici 1948 (Approved Lists 1980)
 Streptomyces cerasinus Kanchanasin et al. 2017
 "Streptomyces cerradoensis" da Silva Sobrinho et al. 2005
 "Streptomyces cervinus" Ōmura et al. 1982

 Streptomyces chartreusis Leach et al. 1953 (Approved Lists 1980)
 Streptomyces chattanoogensis Burns and Holtman 1959 (Approved Lists 1980)
 Streptomyces cheonanensis Kim et al. 2006
 Streptomyces chiangmaiensis Promnuan et al. 2013

 Streptomyces chilikensis Ray et al. 2013
 Streptomyces chitinivorans Ray et al. 2016
 Streptomyces chlorus Kim et al. 2013
 Streptomyces chrestomyceticus Canevazzi and Scotti 1959 (Approved Lists 1980)
 Streptomyces chromofuscus (Preobrazhenskaya et al. 1957) Pridham et al. 1958 (Approved Lists 1980)
 Streptomyces chryseus (Krassilnikov et al. 1965) Pridham 1970 (Approved Lists 1980)

 Streptomyces chumphonensis Phongsopitanun et al. 2014

 Streptomyces cinereoruber Corbaz et al. 1957 (Approved Lists 1980)
 Streptomyces cinereospinus Terekhova et al. 1986
 Streptomyces cinereus (Cross et al. 1963) Goodfellow et al. 1986
 Streptomyces cinerochromogenes Miyairi et al. 1966 (Approved Lists 1980)
 Streptomyces cinnabarigriseus Landwehr et al. 2018
 Streptomyces cinnabarinus (Ryabova and Preobrazhenskaya 1957) Pridham et al. 1958 (Approved Lists 1980)

 Streptomyces cinnamoneus (Benedict et al. 1952) Witt and Stackebrandt 1991
 Streptomyces cirratus Koshiyama et al. 1963 (Approved Lists 1980)

 "Streptomyces citricolor" Kusaka et al. 1968
 Streptomyces clavifer (Millard and Burr 1926) Waksman 1953 (Approved Lists 1980)
 Streptomyces clavuligerus Higgens and Kastner 1971 (Approved Lists 1980)
 Streptomyces coacervatus Shibazaki et al. 2011

 Streptomyces cocklensis Kim et al. 2012
 Streptomyces coelescens (Krassilnikov et al. 1965) Pridham 1970 (Approved Lists 1980)
 Streptomyces coelicoflavus (ex Ryabova and Preobrazhenskaya 1957) Terekhova 1986

 "Streptomyces coeruleoaurantiacus" Gauze et al. 1982
 Streptomyces coeruleoflavus (ex Ryabova and Preobrazhenskaya 1957) Preobrazhenskaya and Maximova 1986
 Streptomyces coeruleofuscus (Preobrazhenskaya 1957) Pridham et al. 1958 (Approved Lists 1980)
 Streptomyces coeruleoprunus Preobrazhenskaya 1986
 Streptomyces coeruleorubidus (Preobrazhenskaya 1957) Pridham et al. 1958 (Approved Lists 1980)
 Streptomyces coerulescens (Preobrazhenskaya 1957) Pridham et al. 1958 (Approved Lists 1980)
 Streptomyces collinus Lindenbein 1952 (Approved Lists 1980)

 "Streptomyces colonosanans" Law et al. 2017
 "Streptomyces conglobatus" Liu et al. 1978
 Streptomyces corchorusii Ahmad and Bhuiyan 1958 (Approved Lists 1980)
 Streptomyces coryli Saygin et al. 2020
 "Streptomyces corynorhini" Hamm et al. 2019

 Streptomyces cremeus (Kudrina 1957) Pridham et al. 1958 (Approved Lists 1980)
 Streptomyces crystallinus Tresner et al. 1961 (Approved Lists 1980)
 "Streptomyces cupreus" Maiti and Mandal 2021
 Streptomyces curacoi Cataldi 1963 (Approved Lists 1980)
 Streptomyces cuspidosporus Higashide et al. 1966 (Approved Lists 1980)
 "Streptomyces cuticulae" Piao et al. 2017
 Streptomyces cyaneochromogenes Tang et al. 2019
 Streptomyces cyaneofuscatus (Kudrina 1957) Pridham et al. 1958 (Approved Lists 1980)
 Streptomyces cyaneus (Krassilnikov 1941) Waksman 1953 (Approved Lists 1980)

 Streptomyces cyslabdanicus Také et al. 2015

D

 Streptomyces daghestanicus (Sveshnikova 1957) Pridham et al. 1958 (Approved Lists 1980)
 Streptomyces daliensis Xu et al. 2012
 Streptomyces dangxiongensis Zhang et al. 2019
 Streptomyces daqingensis Pan et al. 2016
 Streptomyces davaonensis Landwehr et al. 2018
 Streptomyces deccanensis Dastager et al. 2008
 Streptomyces decoyicus (Vavra et al. 1959) Kumar and Goodfellow 2010
 Streptomyces demainii Goodfellow et al. 2008
 "Streptomyces dendra" Selvin 2009
 Streptomyces dengpaensis Li et al. 2018
 Streptomyces desertarenae Li et al. 2019
 Streptomyces deserti Santhanam et al. 2013
 Streptomyces diacarni Li et al. 2019
 Streptomyces diastaticus (Krainsky 1914) Waksman and Henrici 1948 (Approved Lists 1980)
 Streptomyces diastatochromogenes (Krainsky 1914) Waksman and Henrici 1948 (Approved Lists 1980)
 "Streptomyces dimorphogenes" Yokose et al. 1983
 "Streptomyces dioscori" Wang et al. 2018

 Streptomyces djakartensis Huber et al. 1962 (Approved Lists 1980)
 Streptomyces drozdowiczii Semêdo et al. 2004
 Streptomyces durbertensis Yu et al. 2018
 Streptomyces durhamensis Gordon and Lapa 1966 (Approved Lists 1980)
 Streptomyces durmitorensis Savic et al. 2007
 Streptomyces dysideae Glaeser et al. 2021

E

 Streptomyces echinatus Corbaz et al. 1957 (Approved Lists 1980)
 Streptomyces echinoruber Palleroni et al. 1981

 Streptomyces endophyticus Li et al. 2013

 Streptomyces erringtonii Santhanam et al. 2013

 "Streptomyces erythrochromogenes" Abdallah et al. 1982
 Streptomyces erythrogriseus Falcão de Morais and Dália Maia 1959 (Approved Lists 1980)
 Streptomyces eurocidicus (Okami et al. 1954) Witt and Stackebrandt 1991
 Streptomyces europaeiscabiei Bouchek-Mechiche et al. 2000
 Streptomyces eurythermus Corbaz et al. 1957 (Approved Lists 1980)
 Streptomyces exfoliatus (Waksman and Curtis 1916) Waksman and Henrici 1948 (Approved Lists 1980)

F

 Streptomyces fabae Nguyen and Kim 2015
 Streptomyces fagopyri Guo et al. 2020

 Streptomyces fenghuangensis Zhu et al. 2011
 Streptomyces ferralitis Saintpierre-Bonaccio et al. 2004
 "Streptomyces ferrugineus" Ruan et al. 2015

 "Streptomyces ficellus" Argoudelis et al. 1976
 Streptomyces filamentosus Okami and Umezawa 1953 (Approved Lists 1980)
 Streptomyces fildesensis Li et al. 2012
 Streptomyces filipinensis Ammann et al. 1955 (Approved Lists 1980)
 Streptomyces fimbriatus (Millard and Burr 1926) Waksman and Lechevalier 1953 (Approved Lists 1980)

 Streptomyces finlayi (Szabó et al. 1963) Pridham 1970 (Approved Lists 1980)
 "Streptomyces flavalbus" Cao et al. 2018
 Streptomyces flaveolus (Waksman 1923) Waksman and Henrici 1948 (Approved Lists 1980)
 Streptomyces flaveus (Cross et al. 1963) Goodfellow et al. 1986

 Streptomyces flavidovirens (Kudrina 1957) Pridham et al. 1958 (Approved Lists 1980)

 "Streptomyces flavochromogenes" (Krainsky 1914) Waksman and Henrici 1948
 Streptomyces flavofungini (ex Úri and Békési 1958) Szabó and Preobrazhenskaya 1986

 Streptomyces flavotricini (Preobrazhenskaya and Sveshnikova 1957) Pridham et al. 1958 (Approved Lists 1980)
 Streptomyces flavovariabilis (ex Korenyako and Nikitina 1965) Sveshnikova 1986
 Streptomyces flavovirens (Waksman 1923) Waksman and Henrici 1948 (Approved Lists 1980)
 Streptomyces flavoviridis (ex Preobrazhenskaya et al. 1957) Preobrazhenskaya 1986

 Streptomyces fodineus Kim et al. 2019
 Streptomyces formicae Bai et al. 2016
 Streptomyces fractus Rohland and Meyers 2016
 Streptomyces fradiae (Waksman and Curtis 1916) Waksman and Henrici 1948 (Approved Lists 1980)
 Streptomyces fragilis Anderson et al. 1956 (Approved Lists 1980)
 Streptomyces fukangensis Zhang et al. 2014

 Streptomyces fulvorobeus Vinogradova and Preobrazhenskaya 1986
 Streptomyces fumanus (Sveshnikova 1957) Pridham et al. 1958 (Approved Lists 1980)
 Streptomyces fumigatiscleroticus (ex Pridham 1970) Goodfellow et al. 1986
 Streptomyces fuscichromogenes Zhang et al. 2017
 Streptomyces fuscigenes Lee and Whang 2018

G

 Streptomyces galbus Frommer 1959 (Approved Lists 1980)

 Streptomyces gamaensis Zhao et al. 2017
 Streptomyces gancidicus Suzuki 1957
 "Streptomyces gandocaensis" Park et al. 2016
 Streptomyces gardneri (Waksman 1942) Waksman 1961 (Approved Lists 1980)
 Streptomyces gelaticus (Waksman 1923) Waksman and Henrici 1948 (Approved Lists 1980)
 Streptomyces geldanamycininus Goodfellow et al. 2008
 Streptomyces geranii Li et al. 2018
 Streptomyces geysiriensis Wallhäusser et al. 1966 (Approved Lists 1980)

 Streptomyces gilvifuscus Nguyen and Kim 2015
 "Streptomyces gilvigriseus" Ser et al. 2015
 "Streptomyces gilvospiralis" Karwowski et al. 1984
 "Streptomyces ginkgonis" Yan et al. 2018
 Streptomyces glaucescens (Preobrazhenskaya 1957) Pridham et al. 1958 (Approved Lists 1980)
 Streptomyces glauciniger Huang et al. 2004
 Streptomyces glaucosporus (ex Krassilnikov et al. 1968) Agre 1986
 Streptomyces glaucus (ex Lehmann and Schutze 1912) Agre and Preobrazhenskaya 1986
 "Streptomyces glebosus" (Ohmori et al. 1962) Rong and Huang 2012
 Streptomyces globisporus (Krassilnikov 1941) Waksman 1953 (Approved Lists 1980)
 Streptomyces globosus (Krassilnikov 1941) Waksman 1953 (Approved Lists 1980)
 Streptomyces glomeratus (ex Gauze and Sveshnikova 1978) Gauze and Preobrazhenskaya 1986
 Streptomyces glomeroaurantiacus (Krassilnikov and Yuan 1965) Pridham 1970 (Approved Lists 1980)
 Streptomyces glycovorans Xu et al. 2012
 Streptomyces gobitricini (Preobrazhenskaya and Sveshnikova 1957) Pridham et al. 1958 (Approved Lists 1980)
 Streptomyces goshikiensis Niida 1966 (Approved Lists 1980)
 Streptomyces gossypiisoli Zhang et al. 2021

 Streptomyces graminearus Preobrazhenskaya 1986
 Streptomyces gramineus Lee et al. 2012
 Streptomyces graminifolii Lee and Whang 2014
 Streptomyces graminilatus Lee and Whang 2014
 Streptomyces graminisoli Lee and Whang 2014

 Streptomyces griseiniger Goodfellow et al. 2008

 Streptomyces griseoaurantiacus (Krassilnikov and Yuan 1965) Pridham 1970 (Approved Lists 1980)

 Streptomyces griseocarneus (Benedict et al. 1950) Witt and Stackebrandt 1991
 Streptomyces griseochromogenes Fukunaga 1955 (Approved Lists 1980)
 Streptomyces griseoflavus (Krainsky 1914) Waksman and Henrici 1948 (Approved Lists 1980)
 Streptomyces griseofuscus Sakamoto et al. 1962 (Approved Lists 1980)
 Streptomyces griseoincarnatus (Preobrazhenskaya et al. 1957) Pridham et al. 1958 (Approved Lists 1980)
 Streptomyces griseoloalbus (Kudrina 1957) Pridham et al. 1958 (Approved Lists 1980)

 Streptomyces griseoluteus Umezawa et al. 1950 (Approved Lists 1980)
 Streptomyces griseomycini (Preobrazhenskaya et al. 1957) Pridham et al. 1958 (Approved Lists 1980)

 Streptomyces griseorubens (Preobrazhenskaya et al. 1957) Pridham et al. 1958 (Approved Lists 1980)
 Streptomyces griseoruber Yamaguchi and Saburi 1955 (Approved Lists 1980)
 Streptomyces griseorubiginosus (Ryabova and Preobrazhenskaya 1957) Pridham et al. 1958 (Approved Lists 1980)
 Streptomyces griseosporeus Niida and Ogasawara 1960 (Approved Lists 1980)
 Streptomyces griseostramineus (Preobrazhenskaya et al. 1957) Pridham et al. 1958 (Approved Lists 1980)

 Streptomyces griseoviridis Anderson et al. 1956 (Approved Lists 1980)
 Streptomyces griseus (Krainsky 1914) Waksman and Henrici 1948 (Approved Lists 1980)
 Streptomyces guanduensis Xu et al. 2006
 Streptomyces gulbargensis Dastager et al. 2009

H

 Streptomyces hainanensis Jiang et al. 2007
 Streptomyces haliclonae Khan et al. 2010
 Streptomyces halophytocola Qin et al. 2013
 Streptomyces halstedii (Waksman and Curtis 1916) Waksman and Henrici 1948 (Approved Lists 1980)
 Streptomyces harbinensis Liu et al. 2013
 Streptomyces harenosi Kusuma et al. 2020
 Streptomyces hawaiiensis Cron eet al. 1956 (Approved Lists 1980)
 Streptomyces hebeiensis Xu et al. 2004
 Streptomyces heilongjiangensis Liu et al. 2013
 Streptomyces heliomycini (ex Braznikova et al. 1958) Preobrazhenskaya 1986
 Streptomyces helvaticus (Krassilnikov et al. 1965) Pridham 1970 (Approved Lists 1980)
 "Streptomyces helvoloviolaceus" Malkina et al. 1996
 Streptomyces herbaceus Kim et al. 2012

 "Streptomyces himalayensis" Maiti and Mandal 2021
 Streptomyces himastatinicus Kumar and Goodfellow 2008
 Streptomyces hiroshimensis (Shinobu 1955) Witt and Stackebrandt 1991
 Streptomyces hirsutus Ettlinger et al. 1958 (Approved Lists 1980)
 Streptomyces hokutonensis Yamamura et al. 2014
 Streptomyces hoynatensis Veyisoglu and Sahin 2014
 Streptomyces huasconensis Cortés-Albayay et al. 2019
 "Streptomyces humi" Zainal et al. 2016
 Streptomyces humidus Nakazawa and Shibata 1956 (Approved Lists 1980)

 Streptomyces hundungensis Nimaichand et al. 2013
 Streptomyces hyaluromycini Harunari et al. 2016
 Streptomyces hyderabadensis Reddy et al. 2011
 Streptomyces hydrogenans Lindner et al. 1958 (Approved Lists 1980)
 Streptomyces hygroscopicus (Jensen 1931) Yüntsen et al. 1956 (Approved Lists 1980)
 Streptomyces hypolithicus Le Roes-Hill et al. 2009

I

 Streptomyces iakyrus de Querioz and Albert 1962 (Approved Lists 1980)
 Streptomyces iconiensis Tatar et al. 2014
 "Streptomyces idiomorphus" Takizawa et al. 1987
 Streptomyces incanus Kim et al. 2012
 Streptomyces indiaensis (Gupta 1965) Kudo and Seino 1987
 Streptomyces indicus Luo et al. 2011

 Streptomyces indoligenes Luo et al. 2016
 Streptomyces indonesiensis Sembiring et al. 2001
 Streptomyces inhibens Jin et al. 2019
 Streptomyces intermedius (Krüger 1904) Waksman 1953 (Approved Lists 1980)
 Streptomyces inusitatus Hasegawa et al. 1978 (Approved Lists 1980)
 Streptomyces ipomoeae (Person and Martin 1940) Waksman and Henrici 1948 (Approved Lists 1980)
 Streptomyces iranensis Hamedi et al. 2010

J
 Streptomyces janthinus (Artamonova and Krassilnikov 1960) Pridham 1970 (Approved Lists 1980)
 Streptomyces javensis Sembiring et al. 2001
 Streptomyces jeddahensis Röttig et al. 2017
 Streptomyces jietaisiensis He et al. 2005
 Streptomyces jiujiangensis Zhang et al. 2014

K

 Streptomyces kaempferi Santhanam et al. 2013
 Streptomyces kalpinensis Ma et al. 2017
 Streptomyces kanamyceticus Okami and Umezawa 1957 (Approved Lists 1980)
 "Streptomyces kanasensis" Han et al. 2015
 Streptomyces karpasiensis Veyisoglu et al. 2014

 Streptomyces kasugaensis Hamada et al. 1995
 Streptomyces katrae Gupta and Chopra 1963 (Approved Lists 1980)
 "Streptomyces kavutarensis" Ellaiah et al. 2004
 Streptomyces kebangsaanensis Sarmin et al. 2013

 Streptomyces klenkii Veyisoglu and Sahin 2015
 Streptomyces koyangensis Lee et al. 2005
 Streptomyces kronopolitis Liu et al. 2016
 Streptomyces krungchingensis Sripreechasak et al. 2017
 Streptomyces kunmingensis (Ruan et al. 1985) Goodfellow et al. 1986
 Streptomyces kurssanovii (Preobrazhenskaya et al. 1957) Pridham et al. 1958 (Approved Lists 1980)

L

 Streptomyces labedae Lacey 1987

 Streptomyces lacrimifluminis Zhang et al. 2016
 "Streptomyces lactacystinaeus" Tomoda and Omura 2000
 Streptomyces lactacystinicus Také et al. 2017
 "Streptomyces lactamdurans" Stapley et al. 1972
 Streptomyces lacticiproducens Zhu et al. 2011
 Streptomyces laculatispora Zucchi et al. 2012

 Streptomyces lanatus Frommer 1959 (Approved Lists 1980)
 Streptomyces lannensis Promnuan et al. 2013
 Streptomyces lasalocidi Erwin et al. 2020
 "Streptomyces lasii" Liu et al. 2018
 Streptomyces lasiicapitis Ye et al. 2017
 Streptomyces lateritius (Sveshnikova 1957) Pridham et al. 1958 (Approved Lists 1980)
 Streptomyces laurentii Trejo et al. 1979 (Approved Lists 1980)
 Streptomyces lavendofoliae (Kuchaeva et al. 1961) Pridham 1970 (Approved Lists 1980)
 Streptomyces lavendulae (Waksman and Curtis 1916) Waksman and Henrici 1948 (Approved Lists 1980)
 Streptomyces lavenduligriseus (Locci et al. 1969) Witt and Stackebrandt 1991
 Streptomyces lavendulocolor (Kuchaeva et al. 1961) Pridham 1970 (Approved Lists 1980)
 Streptomyces leeuwenhoekii Busarakam et al. 2014
 Streptomyces levis Sveshnikova 1986
 "Streptomyces levoris" (ex Korenyako et al. 1960) Kuznetsov et al. 1998
 Streptomyces libani Baldacci and Grein 1966 (Approved Lists 1980)
 Streptomyces lichenis Saeng-in et al. 2018
 Streptomyces lienomycini Gauze and Maximova 1986
 Streptomyces lilacinus (Nakazawa et al. 1956) Witt and Stackebrandt 1991

 Streptomyces lincolnensis Mason et al. 1963 (Approved Lists 1980)

 Streptomyces litmocidini (Ryabova and Preobrazhenskaya 1957) Pridham et al. 1958 (Approved Lists 1980)
 Streptomyces litoralis Ma et al. 2016
 "Streptomyces lividoclavatus" Arai et al. 1977
 "Streptomyces lohii" Zhang et al. 2013
 Streptomyces lomondensis Johnson and Dietz 1969 (Approved Lists 1980)
 Streptomyces lonarensis Sharma et al. 2016
 Streptomyces longisporoflavus Waksman 1953 (Approved Lists 1980)
 Streptomyces longispororuber Waksman 1953 (Approved Lists 1980)
 Streptomyces longisporus (Krassilnikov 1941) Waksman 1953 (Approved Lists 1980)
 Streptomyces longwoodensis Prosser and Palleroni 1981
 Streptomyces lopnurensis Zheng et al. 2014
 Streptomyces lucensis Arcamone et al 1957 (Approved Lists 1980)
 Streptomyces lunaelactis Maciejewska et al. 2015
 Streptomyces lunalinharesii de Souza et al. 2008
 "Streptomyces luozhongensis" Zhang et al. 2017

 Streptomyces luridus (Krassilnikov et al. 1957) Waksman 1961 (Approved Lists 1980)
 Streptomyces lushanensis Zhang et al. 2015
 Streptomyces lusitanus Villax 1963 (Approved Lists 1980)
 Streptomyces luteireticuli (ex Katoh and Arai 1957) Hatano et al. 2003

 Streptomyces luteogriseus Schmitz et al. 1964 (Approved Lists 1980)
 Streptomyces luteosporeus Witt and Stackebrandt 1991

 Streptomyces luteus Luo et al. 2017
 "Streptomyces lutosisoli" Shen et al. 2018
 Streptomyces lycii Ma et al. 2020
 "Streptomyces lydicamycinicus" Komaki et al. 2020
 Streptomyces lydicus De Boer et al. 1956 (Approved Lists 1980)

M

 "Streptomyces macromomyceticus" Hamada and Okami 1968
 Streptomyces macrosporus (ex Krassilnikov et al. 1968) Goodfellow et al. 1988
 Streptomyces malachitofuscus (ex Preobrazhenskaya et al. 1964) Preobrazhenskaya and Terekhova 1986
 Streptomyces malachitospinus (ex Preobrazhenskaya et al. 1957) Preobrazhenskaya and Terekhova 1986
 "Streptomyces malayensis" McBride et al. 1969
 "Streptomyces malaysiense" Ser et al. 2016
 Streptomyces malaysiensis Al-Tai et al. 1999
 Streptomyces manganisoli Mo et al. 2018
 "Streptomyces mangrovi" Yousif et al. 2015
 Streptomyces mangrovi Wang et al. 2015
 "Streptomyces mangrovisoli" Ser et al. 2015
 Streptomyces manipurensis Nimaichand et al. 2021
 "Streptomyces maoxianensis" Guan et al. 2015
 "Streptomyces marianii" Iniyan et al. 2021
 Streptomyces marinus Khan et al. 2010
 Streptomyces marokkonensis Bouizgarne et al. 2009
 Streptomyces mashuensis (Sawazaki et al. 1955) Witt and Stackebrandt 1991
 Streptomyces massasporeus Shinobu and Kawato 1959 (Approved Lists 1980)
 "Streptomyces massilialgeriensis" Djaballah et al. 2018
 "Streptomyces massiliensis" Pfleiderer et al. 2013

 Streptomyces mauvecolor Okami and Umezawa 1961 (Approved Lists 1980)
 Streptomyces mayteni Chen et al. 2009

 Streptomyces megasporus (ex Krassilnikov et al. 1968) Agre 1986

 Streptomyces melanosporofaciens Arcamone et al. 1959 (Approved Lists 1980)
 "Streptomyces melanovinaceus" Tomita et al. 1983
 Streptomyces mesophilus Tokatli et al. 2021
 Streptomyces mexicanus Petrosyan et al. 2003
 Streptomyces michiganensis Corbaz et al. 1957 (Approved Lists 1980)
 Streptomyces microflavus (Krainsky 1914) Waksman and Henrici 1948 (Approved Lists 1980)
 Streptomyces milbemycinicus Kumar and Goodfellow 2010
 Streptomyces mimosae Klykleung et al. 2020
 Streptomyces minutiscleroticus (Thirumalachar 1965) Pridham 1970 (Approved Lists 1980)
 Streptomyces mirabilis Ruschmann 1952 (Approved Lists 1980)

 Streptomyces misionensis Cercos et al. 1962 (Approved Lists 1980)
 Streptomyces mobaraensis (Nagatsu and Suzuki 1963) Witt and Stackebrandt 1991
 "Streptomyces monashensis" Law et al. 2019
 Streptomyces monomycini Gauze and Terekhova 1986
 Streptomyces montanus Jiang et al. 2020
 "Streptomyces monticola" Li et al. 2019
 Streptomyces mordarskii Kumar and Goodfellow 2008
 Streptomyces morookaense corrig. (Locci and Schofield 1989) Witt and Stackebrandt 1991

 Streptomyces muensis Ningthoujam et al. 2014
 Streptomyces murinus Frommer 1959 (Approved Lists 1980)
 Streptomyces mutabilis (Preobrazhenskaya and Ryabova 1957) Pridham et al. 1958 (Approved Lists 1980)
 Streptomyces mutomycini Gauze and Maximova 1986
 "Streptomyces myxogenes" Itoh et al. 1981

N

 Streptomyces naganishii Yamaguchi and Saburi 1955 (Approved Lists 1980)
 "Streptomyces nanchangensis" Ouyang et al. 1984
 Streptomyces nanhaiensis Tian et al. 2012
 "Streptomyces nanningensis" Jiang et al. 2005
 Streptomyces nanshensis Tian et al. 2009
 Streptomyces narbonensis Corbaz et al. 1955 (Approved Lists 1980)
 Streptomyces nashvillensis McVeigh and Reyes 1961 (Approved Lists 1980)
 "Streptomyces natalensis" Struyk et al. 1958
 "Streptomyces neopeptinius" Han et al. 2008
 Streptomyces netropsis (Finlay et al. 1951) Witt and Stackebrandt 1991
 Streptomyces neyagawaensis Yamamoto et al. 1960 (Approved Lists 1980)
 Streptomyces niger (Thirumalachar 1955) Goodfellow et al. 1986
 "Streptomyces nigra"  Chen et al. 2018
 Streptomyces nigrescens (Sveshnikova 1957) Pridham et al. 1958 (Approved Lists 1980)

 Streptomyces nitrosporeus Okami 1952 (Approved Lists 1980)
 Streptomyces niveiscabiei Park et al. 2003
 Streptomyces niveoruber Ettlinger et al. 1958 (Approved Lists 1980)
 Streptomyces niveus Smith et al. 1956 (Approved Lists 1980)
 "Streptomyces nobilis" Baldacci et al. 1965
 Streptomyces noboritoensis Isono et al. 1957 (Approved Lists 1980)
 Streptomyces nodosus Trejo 1961 (Approved Lists 1980)
 Streptomyces nogalater Bhuyan and Dietz 1966 (Approved Lists 1980)
 Streptomyces nojiriensis Ishida et al. 1967 (Approved Lists 1980)
 Streptomyces noursei Brown et al. 1953 (Approved Lists 1980)
 Streptomyces novaecaesareae Waksman and Henrici 1948 (Approved Lists 1980)
 "Streptomyces novoguineensis" Iwasa et al. 1977

O

 "Streptomyces oceani" Tian et al. 2012
 Streptomyces ochraceiscleroticus Pridham 1970 (Approved Lists 1980)
 Streptomyces odonnellii Pereira et al. 2017

 Streptomyces olivaceiscleroticus Pridham 1970 (Approved Lists 1980)
 Streptomyces olivaceoviridis (Preobrazhenskaya and Ryabova 1957) Pridham et al. 1958 (Approved Lists 1980)
 Streptomyces olivaceus (Waksman 1923) Waksman and Henrici 1948 (Approved Lists 1980)
 Streptomyces olivicoloratus Nguyen and Kim 2015
 Streptomyces olivochromogenes (Waksman 1923) Waksman and Henrici 1948 (Approved Lists 1980)
 Streptomyces olivomycini (Gauze and Sveshnikova 1986) Witt and Stackebrandt 1991

 "Streptomyces olivovariabilis" Zhdanovich et al. 1982
 Streptomyces olivoverticillatus (Shinobu 1956) Witt and Stackebrandt 1991

 Streptomyces omiyaensis Umezawa and Okami 1950 (Approved Lists 1980)

 Streptomyces orinoci (Cassinelli et al. 1967) Witt and Stackebrandt 1991
 "Streptomyces ornatus" Calot and Cercos 1963
 Streptomyces oryzae Mingma et al. 2016
 Streptomyces oryziradicis Li et al. 2020
 Streptomyces osmaniensis Reddy et al. 2010
 "Streptomyces ossamyceticus" (Schmitz et al. 1965) Rong and Huang 2012
 Streptomyces otsuchiensis Terahara et al. 2019
 Streptomyces ovatisporus Veyisoglu et al. 2016

P

 Streptomyces pactum Bhuyan et al. 1962 (Approved Lists 1980)
 Streptomyces palmae Sujarit et al. 2016
 Streptomyces paludis Zhao et al. 2020
 Streptomyces panacagri Cui et al. 2012
 Streptomyces panaciradicis Lee et al. 2014

 Streptomyces paradoxus Goodfellow et al. 1986
 Streptomyces paromomycinus (Coffey et al. 1959) Komaki and Tamura 2019

 Streptomyces parvulus corrig. Waksman and Gregory 1954 (Approved Lists 1980)
 Streptomyces parvus (Krainsky 1914) Waksman and Henrici 1948 (Approved Lists 1980)
 Streptomyces pathocidini (Nagatsu et al. 1962) Labeda et al. 2014
 Streptomyces paucisporeus Xu et al. 2006
 "Streptomyces paulus" Hanka and Dietz 1976
 "Streptomyces pentaticus" Umezawa et al. 1958
 Streptomyces peucetius Grein et al. 1963 (Approved Lists 1980)
 Streptomyces phaeochromogenes (Conn 1917) Waksman 1957 (Approved Lists 1980)
 Streptomyces phaeofaciens Maeda et al. 1952 (Approved Lists 1980)

 Streptomyces phaeolivaceus Mo et al. 2020
 Streptomyces phaeoluteichromatogenes Goodfellow et al. 2008
 Streptomyces phaeoluteigriseus Goodfellow et al. 2008

 Streptomyces pharetrae Le Roes and Meyers 2005
 Streptomyces pharmamarensis Carro et al. 2012
 "Candidatus Streptomyces philanthi" Kaltenpoth et al. 2006

 Streptomyces phyllanthi Klykleung et al. 2016
 "Streptomyces physcomitrii" Zhuang et al. 2020
 Streptomyces phytohabitans Bian et al. 2012
 Streptomyces pilosus Ettlinger et al. 1958 (Approved Lists 1980)
 Streptomyces pini Madhaiyan et al. 2016
 "Streptomyces piniterrae" Zhuang et al. 2020
 Streptomyces platensis Tresner and Backus 1956 (Approved Lists 1980)
 Streptomyces plicatus Pridham et al. 1958 (Approved Lists 1980)
 Streptomyces plumbiresistens Guo et al. 2009
 Streptomyces pluricolorescens Okami and Umezawa 1961 (Approved Lists 1980)
 Streptomyces pluripotens Lee et al. 2014
 "Streptomyces polaris" Kamjam et al. 2019
 Streptomyces polyantibioticus Le Roes-Hill and Meyers 2009
 "Streptomyces polyasparticus" Liu et al. 2021
 Streptomyces polychromogenes Hagemann et al. 1964 (Approved Lists 1980)
 Streptomyces polygonati Guo et al. 2016
 Streptomyces polymachus Nguyen and Kim 2015
 "Streptomyces polyrhachii" Yu et al. 2013
 Streptomyces poonensis (Thirumalachar 1960) Pridham 1970 (Approved Lists 1980)
 Streptomyces populi Wang et al. 2018

 Streptomyces prasinopilosus Ettlinger et al. 1958 (Approved Lists 1980)
 Streptomyces prasinosporus Tresner et al. 1966 (Approved Lists 1980)
 Streptomyces prasinus Ettlinger et al. 1958 (Approved Lists 1980)
 Streptomyces pratens Kim et al. 2012
 Streptomyces pratensis Rong et al. 2014
 "Streptomyces propurpuratus" Shinobu and Kanda 1970
 Streptomyces prunicolor (Ryabova and Preobrazhenskaya 1957) Pridham et al. 1958 (Approved Lists 1980)

 Streptomyces pseudoechinosporeus Goodfellow et al. 1986
 Streptomyces pseudogriseolus Okami and Umezawa 1955 (Approved Lists 1980)
 Streptomyces pseudovenezuelae (Kuchaeva et al. 1961) Pridham 1970 (Approved Lists 1980)
 Streptomyces pulveraceus Shibata et al. 1961 (Approved Lists 1980)
 Streptomyces puniceus Patelski 1951 (Approved Lists 1980)
 Streptomyces puniciscabiei Park et al. 2003

 Streptomyces purpurascens Lindenbein 1952 (Approved Lists 1980)
 Streptomyces purpureus (Matsumae and Hata 1968) Goodfellow et al. 1986
 Streptomyces purpurogeneiscleroticus corrig. Pridham 1970 (Approved Lists 1980)

Q
 "Streptomyces qaidamensis" Zhang et al. 2018
 Streptomyces qinglanensis Hu et al. 2012
 "Streptomyces qinlingensis" Ji et al. 2007
 Streptomyces qinzhouensis Zhu et al. 2020

R

 Streptomyces racemochromogenes Sugai 1956 (Approved Lists 1980)
 Streptomyces radiopugnans Mao et al. 2007
 Streptomyces rameus Shibata 1959 (Approved Lists 1980)
 Streptomyces ramulosus Ettlinger et al. 1958 (Approved Lists 1980)

 Streptomyces rapamycinicus Kumar and Goodfellow 2008
 Streptomyces recifensis (Gonçalves de Lima et al. 1955) Falcão de Morais et al. 1957 (Approved Lists 1980)

 Streptomyces rectiviolaceus (ex Artamonova 1965) Sveshnikova 1986
 Streptomyces regensis Gupta et al. 1963 (Approved Lists 1980)
 Streptomyces reniochalinae Li et al. 2019
 Streptomyces resistomycificus Lindenbein 1952 (Approved Lists 1980)
 Streptomyces reticuliscabiei Bouchek-Mechiche et al. 2000
 Streptomyces rhizophilus Lee and Whang 2014
 Streptomyces rhizosphaericola Vargas Hoyos et al. 2019
 Streptomyces rhizosphaericus corrig. Sembiring et al. 2001
 Streptomyces rhizosphaerihabitans Lee and Whang 2016

 "Streptomyces ribosidificus" Shomura et al. 1970
 Streptomyces rimosus Sobin et al. 1953 (Approved Lists 1980)
 Streptomyces rishiriensis Kawaguchi et al. 1965 (Approved Lists 1980)
 Streptomyces rochei Berger et al. 1953 (Approved Lists 1980)
 Streptomyces roietensis Kaewkla and Franco 2017
 Streptomyces rosealbus corrig. Xu et al. 2012
 Streptomyces roseicoloratus Zhang et al. 2020
 Streptomyces roseifaciens van der Aart et al. 2019
 Streptomyces roseiscleroticus Pridham 1970 (Approved Lists 1980)

 Streptomyces roseofulvus (Preobrazhenskaya 1957) Pridham et al. 1958 (Approved Lists 1980)
 Streptomyces roseolilacinus (Preobrazhenskaya and Sveshnikova 1957) Pridham et al. 1958 (Approved Lists 1980)
 Streptomyces roseolus (Preobrazhenskaya and Sveshnikova 1957) Pridham et al. 1958 (Approved Lists 1980)

 Streptomyces roseoviolaceus (Sveshnikova 1957) Pridham et al. 1958 (Approved Lists 1980)
 Streptomyces roseoviridis (Preobrazhenskaya 1957) Pridham et al. 1958 (Approved Lists 1980)

 "Streptomyces rubellomurinus" Okuhara et al. 1980
 Streptomyces ruber (Thirumalachar 1955) Goodfellow et al. 1986
 Streptomyces rubidus Xu et al. 2006
 Streptomyces rubiginosohelvolus (Kudrina 1957) Pridham et al. 1958 (Approved Lists 1980)
 Streptomyces rubiginosus (Preobrazhenskaya et al. 1957) Pridham et al. 1958 (Approved Lists 1980)
 Streptomyces rubrisoli Guo et al. 2015
 Streptomyces rubrogriseus (ex Krassilnikov 1970) Terekhova 1986

 Streptomyces rubrus corrig. Khan et al. 2011
 "Streptomyces rugosporus" Singh et al. 1994

S

 "Streptomyces sabulosicollis" Kusuma et al. 2021
 Streptomyces salilacus Luo et al. 2018

 Streptomyces samsunensis Sazak et al. 2011
 "Streptomyces sandaensis" Iwami et al. 1987
 Streptomyces sanglieri Manfio et al. 2003
 Streptomyces sannanensis Iwasaki et al. 1981
 Streptomyces sanyensis Sui et al. 2011

 Streptomyces sasae Lee and Whang 2015
 Streptomyces scabichelini Gencbay et al. 2021
 Streptomyces scabiei corrig. (ex Thaxter 1891) Lambert and Loria 1989

 "Streptomyces sclerogranulatus" Shimazu et al. 1969
 Streptomyces sclerotialus Pridham 1970 (Approved Lists 1980)
 Streptomyces scopiformis Li et al. 2002
 Streptomyces scopuliridis Farris et al. 2011
 Streptomyces sedi Li et al. 2009
 Streptomyces sediminis Ay et al. 2018
 Streptomyces seoulensis Chun et al. 1997

 "Streptomyces septentrionalis" Kamjam et al. 2019

 Streptomyces seymenliensis Tatar and Sahin 2015
 Streptomyces shaanxiensis Lin et al. 2012
 Streptomyces shenzhenensis Hu et al. 2012
 Streptomyces showdoensis Nishimura et al. 1964 (Approved Lists 1980)
 Streptomyces siamensis Sripreechasak et al. 2016
 Streptomyces silaceus Labeda et al. 2009
 Streptomyces similanensis Sripreechasak et al. 2016
 Streptomyces sindenensis Nakazawa and Fujii 1957 (Approved Lists 1980)
 Streptomyces sioyaensis Nishimura et al. 1961 (Approved Lists 1980)
 Streptomyces smaragdinus Schwitalla et al. 2020
 Streptomyces smyrnaeus Tatar et al. 2014
 Streptomyces sodiiphilus Li et al. 2005
 "Streptomyces soli" Xing et al. 2020
 Streptomyces solisilvae Zhou et al. 2017
 Streptomyces somaliensis (Brumpt 1906) Waksman and Henrici 1948 (Approved Lists 1980)
 "Streptomyces songpinggouensis" Guan et al. 2016
 "Streptomyces spadicogriseus" Komatsu et al. 1980
 Streptomyces sparsogenes Owen et al. 1963 (Approved Lists 1980)
 Streptomyces sparsus Jiang et al. 2011
 Streptomyces specialis Kämpfer et al. 2008
 Streptomyces spectabilis Mason et al. 1961 (Approved Lists 1980)
 Streptomyces speibonae Meyers et al. 2003
 Streptomyces speleomycini Preobrazhenskaya and Szabó 1986

 Streptomyces spinoverrucosus Diab and Al-Gounaim 1982
 Streptomyces spiralis (Falcão de Morais 1970) Goodfellow et al. 1986
 Streptomyces spiroverticillatus Shinobu 1958 (Approved Lists 1980)

 Streptomyces spongiae Khan et al. 2011
 Streptomyces spongiicola Huang et al. 2016
 Streptomyces sporangiiformans Zhao et al. 2020

 Streptomyces spororaveus (ex Krassilnikov 1970) Preobrazhenskaya 1986
 Streptomyces sporoverrucosus (ex Krassilnikov 1970) Preobrazhenskaya 1986
 Streptomyces staurosporininus Kim et al. 2012
 "Streptomyces steffisburgensis" Dietz 1967 	
 Streptomyces stelliscabiei Bouchek-Mechiche et al. 2000
 Streptomyces stramineus Labeda et al. 1997
 Streptomyces subrutilus Arai et al. 1964 (Approved Lists 1980)
 "Streptomyces sudanensis" Quintana et al. 2008
 Streptomyces sulfonofaciens Miyadoh et al. 1983
 Streptomyces sulphureus (Gasperini 1894) Waksman 1953 (Approved Lists 1980)
 Streptomyces sundarbansensis Arumugam et al. 2011
 "Streptomyces sviceus" Hanka and Dietz 1973
 Streptomyces swartbergensis Le Roes-Hill et al. 2018
 Streptomyces synnematoformans Hozzein and Goodfellow 2007

T

 Streptomyces tacrolimicus Martínez-Castro et al. 2011
 Streptomyces tailanensis Sun et al. 2020
 "Streptomyces taklimakanensis" Yuan et al. 2020
 Streptomyces tanashiensis Hata et al. 1952 (Approved Lists 1980)
 Streptomyces tateyamensis Khan et al. 2010
 Streptomyces tauricus (ex Ivanitskaya et al. 1966) Sveshnikova 1986
 Streptomyces tendae Ettlinger et al. 1958 (Approved Lists 1980)
 "Streptomyces tenjimariensis" Okami et al. 1979
 Streptomyces termitum Duché et al. 1951 (Approved Lists 1980)
 Streptomyces thermoalcalitolerans Kim et al. 1999
 "Streptomyces thermoalkaliphilus" Wu et al. 2018
 Streptomyces thermoautotrophicus Gadkari et al. 1991
 Streptomyces thermocarboxydovorans Kim et al. 1998
 Streptomyces thermocarboxydus Kim et al. 1998
 Streptomyces thermocoprophilus Kim et al. 2000
 Streptomyces thermodiastaticus (Bergey et al. 1923) Waksman 1953 (Approved Lists 1980)
 Streptomyces thermogriseus Xu et al. 1998
 Streptomyces thermolineatus Goodfellow et al. 1988

 Streptomyces thermospinosisporus corrig. Kim and Goodfellow 2002
 Streptomyces thermoviolaceus Henssen 1957 (Approved Lists 1980)
 Streptomyces thermovulgaris Henssen 1957 (Approved Lists 1980)
 Streptomyces thinghirensis Loqman et al. 2009
 "Streptomyces thiolactonus" Dolak et al. 1986
 Streptomyces thioluteus (Okami 1952) Witt and Stackebrandt 1991
 "Streptomyces tibetensis" Li et al. 2020
 Streptomyces tirandamycinicus Huang et al. 2019
 "Streptomyces tokashikiensis" Iwami et al. 1989
 "Streptomyces tokunonensis" Kawamura et al. 1982
 "Streptomyces tolypophorus" Shibata et al. 1971
 Streptomyces torulosus Lyons and Pridham 1971 (Approved Lists 1980)
 Streptomyces toxytricini (Preobrazhenskaya and Sveshnikova 1957) Pridham et al. 1958 (Approved Lists 1980)
 Streptomyces tremellae Wen et al. 2016
 Streptomyces tricolor (Wollenweber 1920) Waksman 1961 (Approved Lists 1980) 
 Streptomyces triticagri Han et al. 2020
 Streptomyces tritici Zhao et al. 2018
 "Streptomyces triticiradicis" Yu et al. 2020
 Streptomyces triticirhizae Han et al. 2020
 Streptomyces triticisoli Tian et al. 2018
 Streptomyces tritolerans Dastager et al. 2009
 Streptomyces tsukubensis Muramatsu and Nagai 2013
 Streptomyces tubercidicus Nakamura 1961 (Approved Lists 1980)
 Streptomyces tuirus Albert and Malaquias de Querioz 1963 (Approved Lists 1980)
 Streptomyces tunisialbus Ayed et al. 2020
 Streptomyces tunisiensis Slama et al. 2014
 Streptomyces turgidiscabies Miyajima et al. 1998
 "Streptomyces typhae" Peng et al. 2021
 Streptomyces tyrosinilyticus Zhao et al. 2015

U
 Streptomyces umbrinus (Sveshnikova 1957) Pridham et al. 1958 (Approved Lists 1980)
 "Streptomyces uncialis" Williams et al. 2008
 "Streptomyces unzenensis" Kuroda et al. 1980
 Streptomyces ureilyticus Tokatli et al. 2021
 "Streptomyces urticae" Piao et al. 2018

V

 Streptomyces variabilis (Preobrazhenskaya et al. 1957) Pridham et al. 1958 (Approved Lists 1980)
 Streptomyces variegatus Sveshnikova and Timuk 1986
 Streptomyces varsoviensis Kurylowicz and Woznicka 1967 (Approved Lists 1980)
 Streptomyces vastus Szabó and Marton 1958 (Approved Lists 1980)
 Streptomyces venetus Sujarit et al. 2018
 Streptomyces venezuelae Ehrlich et al. 1948 (Approved Lists 1980)
 Streptomyces verrucosisporus Phongsopitanun et al. 2016
 "Streptomyces verticillus" Takita 1959
 Streptomyces vietnamensis Zhu et al. 2007
 Streptomyces vinaceus Jones 1952 (Approved Lists 1980)
 Streptomyces vinaceusdrappus  Pridham et al. 1958 (Approved Lists 1980)
 Streptomyces violaceochromogenes (Ryabova and Preobrazhenskaya 1957) Pridham 1970 (Approved Lists 1980)
 Streptomyces violaceolatus (Krassilnikov et al. 1965) Pridham 1970 (Approved Lists 1980)

 Streptomyces violaceorectus (Ryabova and Preobrazhenskaya 1957) Pridham et al. 1958 (Approved Lists 1980)
 Streptomyces violaceoruber (Waksman and Curtis 1916) Pridham 1970 (Approved Lists 1980)
 Streptomyces violaceorubidus Terekhova 1986
 Streptomyces violaceus (Rossi Doria 1891) Waksman 1953 (Approved Lists 1980)
 Streptomyces violaceusniger corrig. (Waksman and Curtis 1916) Pridham et al. 1958 (Approved Lists 1980)
 Streptomyces violarus (Artamonova and Krassilnikov 1960) Pridham 1970 (Approved Lists 1980)
 Streptomyces violascens (Preobrazhenskaya and Sveshnikova 1957) Pridham et al. 1958 (Approved Lists 1980)

 Streptomyces violens (Kalakoutskii and Krassilnikov 1960) Goodfellow et al. 1987
 Streptomyces virens Gauze and Sveshnikova 1986
 Streptomyces virginiae Grundy et al. 1952 (Approved Lists 1980)

 Streptomyces viridis Kim et al. 2013
 Streptomyces viridiviolaceus (Ryabova and Preobrazhenskaya 1957) Pridham et al. 1958 (Approved Lists 1980)
 Streptomyces viridobrunneus (ex Krassilnikov 1970) Terekhova 1986
 Streptomyces viridochromogenes (Krainsky 1914) Waksman and Henrici 1948 (Approved Lists 1980)
 Streptomyces viridodiastaticus (Baldacci et al. 1955) Pridham et al. 1958 (Approved Lists 1980)

 Streptomyces viridosporus Pridham et al. 1958 (Approved Lists 1980)

 Streptomyces vitaminophilus corrig. (Shomura et al. 1983) Goodfellow et al. 1986
 "Streptomyces vulcanius" Jia et al. 2015

W
 Streptomyces wedmorensis (ex Milard and Burr 1926) Preobrazhenskaya 1986
 Streptomyces wellingtoniae Kumar and Goodfellow 2010
 Streptomyces werraensis Wallhäusser et al. 1964 (Approved Lists 1980)

 Streptomyces wuyuanensis Zhang et al. 2013

X

 Streptomyces xanthochromogenes Arishima et al. 1956 (Approved Lists 1980)

 Streptomyces xantholiticus (Konev and Tsyganov 1962) Pridham 1970 (Approved Lists 1980)
 Streptomyces xanthophaeus Lindenbein 1952 (Approved Lists 1980)
 Streptomyces xiamenensis Xu et al. 2009
 "Streptomyces xiangluensis" Zhao et al. 2018
 Streptomyces xiangtanensis Mo et al. 2021
 "Streptomyces xiaopingdaonensis" Chen et al. 2015
 Streptomyces xinghaiensis Zhao et al. 2009
 "Streptomyces xinjiangensis" Cheng et al. 2016
 Streptomyces xishensis Xu et al. 2012
 Streptomyces xylanilyticus Moonmangmee et al. 2017

Y

 Streptomyces yaanensis Zheng et al. 2013
 Streptomyces yanglinensis Xu et al. 2006
 Streptomyces yangpuensis Tang et al. 2016
 Streptomyces yanii Liu et al. 2005
 Streptomyces yatensis Saintpierre et al. 2003
 Streptomyces yeochonensis Kim et al. 2004
 Streptomyces yerevanensis Goodfellow et al. 1986
 Streptomyces yogyakartensis Sembiring et al. 2001
 Streptomyces yokosukanensis Nakamura 1961 (Approved Lists 1980)
 Streptomyces youssoufiensis Hamdali et al. 2011
 Streptomyces yunnanensis Zhang et al. 2003

Z

 Streptomyces zagrosensis Mohammadipanah et al. 2014
 Streptomyces zaomyceticus Hinuma 1954 (Approved Lists 1980)
 "Streptomyces zelensis" Hanka et al. 1978
 Streptomyces zhaozhouensis He et al. 2014
 Streptomyces zhihengii Huang et al. 2017
 Streptomyces zinciresistens Lin et al. 2011
 Streptomyces ziwulingensis Lin et al. 2013

References

External links 
 BacDive TAXplorer
 The Encyclopedia of Life

Streptomyces
List of Streptomyces species